Foot whipping, falanga/falaka or bastinado is a method of inflicting pain and humiliation by administering a beating on the soles of a person's bare feet. Unlike most types of flogging, it is meant more to be painful than to cause actual injury to the victim. Blows are generally delivered with a light rod, knotted cord, or lash.

The receiving person is forced to be barefoot and soles of the feet are placed in an exposed position. The beating is typically performed with an object like a cane or switch. The strokes are usually aimed at the arches of the feet and repeated a certain number of times.

Bastinado is also referred to as foot (bottom) caning or sole caning, depending on the instrument in use.  The German term is Bastonade, deriving from the Italian noun bastonata (stroke with the use of a stick). In former times it was also referred to as Sohlenstreich (corr. striking the soles). The Chinese term is dǎ jiǎoxīn (打脚心 / 打腳心).

Overview
The first clearly identified written documentation of bastinado in Europe dates to 1537, and in China to 960. References to bastinado have been hypothesised to also be found in the Bible (Prov. 22:15; Lev. 19:20; Deut. 22:18), suggesting use of the practice since antiquity.

This subform of flagellation differentiates from most other forms by limiting the strokes to a very narrow section of the body. The beatings typically aim at the vaults of the feet where the soles are particularly pain-sensitive, usually avoiding hitting the balls and heels of the feet directly, concentrating on the small area in between.

As the skin texture under the soles of the feet can naturally endure high levels of strain, injuries demanding medical attention, such as lacerations or bruises, are rarely inflicted if certain precautions are observed by the person performing the flagellation. The undersides of the feet have therefore become a common target for corporal punishment in many cultures, while the details of the practice vary regionally.

Foot whipping is typically carried out within prisons and similar institutions. Besides inflicting intense physical suffering, it trades on the significance of bare feet as a dishonouring socio-cultural attribute; consequently it is regarded as a particularly humiliating as well as degrading form of punishment.

Because wearing shoes is an integral element of societal practices since antiquity, the visual exposure of bare feet is a traditional and sometimes even ritualistic practice to display the subjection or submission of a person under a manifestation of superior power. It was often used as a visual indicator of a subservient standing within a social structure and to display the imbalance in power, and was therefore routinely imposed as a visual identifier on slaves and prisoners who had been divested of rights and liberties. Exploiting its socio-cultural significance, people have been forced to go barefoot as a formal shame sanction and for public humiliation as well. Keeping prisoners barefoot is common practice in several countries of today.

Foot whipping therefore poses a distinct threat and is often particularly dreaded by potential victims (usually prisoners). Exploiting these effects, prisons typically used this penalty to maintain discipline and compliance.

Bastinado is commonly associated with Middle and Far Eastern nations, where it is occasionally performed in public, and thus is documented by occasional reports and photographs. However it has been frequently practised in the Western World as well, particularly in prisons, reformatories, boarding schools and similar institutions.

In Europe bastinado was a frequently encountered form of corporal punishment particularly in German areas, where it was mainly carried out to enforce discipline within penal and reformatory institutions, culminating during the Third Reich era. In several German and Austrian institutions it was still practised during the 1950s. Although bastinado was practised in penal institutions of the Western world until the late 20th century, it was barely noticed as there is no reference to its ever being adjudged on a high level. Instead, it was carried out on a rather low level within the confines of the institutions, typically to punish inmates during incarceration. If not specifically authorized, the practice was usually condoned, while happening unbeknownst to the public. Also, foot whipping rarely attracts public interest in general, as it appears unspectacular and relatively inoffensive compared to other punishment methods. Because it was not carried out publicly in the western world, it was usually witnessed only by those individuals directly involved. Given that bastinado is widely perceived as a degrading punishment and a public humiliation, former prisoners rarely report incidents, while the perpetrators are usually obliged to confidentiality.

Bastinado is still used as prison punishment in several countries. Since it causes a high level of suffering for the victim and physical evidence remains largely undetectable for some time, it is frequently used in interrogation and torture.

Appearance 
Bastinado usually requires a certain amount of collaborative effort and an authoritarian presence on the executing party to be enforced. Therefore, it typically appears in settings where corporal punishment is officially approved to be exerted on predefined group of people. This can be situations of imprisonment and incarceration as well as slavery. This moderated subform of flagellation is characteristically prevalent where subjected individuals are forced to remain barefoot.

Regional 
Foot whipping was common practice as means of disciplinary punishment in different kinds of institutions throughout Central Europe until the 1950s, especially in German territories. 
In German prisons this method consistently served as the principal disciplinary punishment. Throughout the Nazi era it was frequently used in German penal institutions and labour camps.It was also inflicted on the population in occupied territories, notably Denmark and Norway.

During the era of slavery in Brazil and the American South it was often used whenever so-called "clean beating" instead of the prevalent more radical forms of flagellation was demanded. This was the case when a loss in market value through visible injuries especially on females was to be avoided. As many so-called "slave-codes" included a barefoot constraint, bastinado required minimal effort to be performed. As it was sufficiently effective but usually left no visible or relevant injuries, bastinado was often used as an alternative for female slaves with higher market value.

Bastinado is still practised in penal institutions of several countries around the world. In a 1967 survey 83% of the inmates in Greek prisons reported about frequent infliction of bastinado. It was also used against rioting students. In Spanish prisons 39% of the inmates reported about this kind of treatment. The French Sûreté reportedly used it to extract confessions. The British used it in Palestine, and the French in Algeria. Within Colonial India it was used to punish tax offenders. Within penal institutions in Europe bastinado was reportedly used in Germany, Austria, France, Spain, Greece, Poland, Romania, Bulgaria, Portugal, North Macedonia, Lithuania, Georgia, Ukraine, Cyprus, Slovakia and Croatia. Other nations with documented use of bastinado are Syria, Turkey, Morocco, Iran, Egypt, Iraq, Libya, Lebanon, Tunisia, Yemen, Saudi Arabia, Kuwait, Brazil, Argentina, Nicaragua, Chile, South Africa, Venezuela, Rhodesia, Zimbabwe, Paraguay, Honduras, Bolivia, Ethiopia, Somalia, Kenya, Cameroon, Mauritius, Philippines, South Korea, Pakistan and Nepal.

In history 
The Bastinado was a common punishment during Mexico's Porfirian era, when the Rurales secret police would commonly use bull penises for the task. 
In the United States, corporal punishment through foot whipping was reported from juvenile penal institutions until 1969, as for example in Massachusetts.
Foot whipping was practised in juvenile institutions and protectories in Austria until the 1960s.
In the German Third Reich, foot whipping was used as a method of torture in concentration camps.
 Indian Imperial Police officer Charles Tegart is said to have instituted foot whipping, a practice derived from Ottoman times, in an interrogation centre established at Jerusalem in 1938 as part of the effort to suppress the 1936–39 Arab revolt in Palestine.
Foot whipping was used by Fascist Blackshirts against Freemasons critical of Benito Mussolini as early as 1923 (Dalzell, 1961).
It was used as a method of torture during the Greek Civil War of 1946 to 1949 and the regime of the Colonels from 1967 to 1974.
Applied by the Soviet Union to Vsevolod Meyerhold in 1939.
It was reported that Russian prisoners of war were "bastinadoed' at Afion camp by their Ottoman captors during World War I. However, British prisoners escaped this treatment.
Foot whipping was, among other methods, used as a method of obtaining confession from alleged political criminals during the communist regime of Czechoslovakia
Bahá'u'lláh (founder of the Baháʼí Faith) underwent foot whipping in August 1852. (Esslemont, 1937).
Foot whipping was used at the S-21 prison in Phnom Penh during the rule of the Khmer Rouge and is mentioned in the ten regulations to prisoners now on display in the Tuol Sleng Genocide Museum.
This punishment has, at various times, been used in China. "No crimes pass unpunished in China. The bastinado is the common punishment for slight faults, and the number of blows is proportionable to the nature of the fault... When the number of blows does not exceed twenty, it is accounted a fatherly correction. The emperor himself sometimes commands it to be inflicted on great persons, and afterwards sees them and treats them as usual."

Modern era

Foot whipping was a commonly reported torture method used by the security officers of Bahrain on its citizens between 1974 and 2001. See Torture in Bahrain.
Falanga is allegedly used by the Zimbabwe Republic Police (ZRP) against persons suspected of involvement with the opposition Movement for Democratic Change parties (MDC-T and MDC-M).
The Prime Minister of Eswatini, Barnabas Sibusiso Dlamini, threatened to use this form of torture (sipakatane) to punish South African activists who had taken part in a mass protest for democracy in that country.
Reportedly used during the dictatorship of Saddam Hussein in Iraq (1979–2003).
Reportedly used in Tunisia by security forces.
Recent research in imaging of torture victims confirms it is still used in several other countries.
Foot whipping amongst other methods is still practised today in the torture of prisoners in Russia.
Foot whipping is a common torture method in Saudi Arabia.

In literature 

In act V, scene I of the Shakespearean comedy As You Like It, Touchstone threatens William with the line: "I will deal in poison with thee, or in bastinado, or in steel..."
In act I, scene X of Wolfgang Amadeus Mozart's opera, Die Entführung aus dem Serail ("The Abduction from the Seraglio"), Osmin threatens Belmonte and Pedrillo with bastinado: "Sonst soll die Bastonade Euch gleich zu Diensten steh'n." (lit. "Or the bastonade will serve you soon.").
In act I, scene XIX of Mozart's opera The Magic Flute, Sarastro orders Monostatos to be punished with 77 blows on the soles of his feet: "He! gebt dem Ehrenmann sogleich/nur sieben und siebenzig Sohlenstreich'." (lit. "Give the gentleman immediately just seventy-seven strokes on the soles.")
In Chapter 8, Climatic Conditions, of Robert Irwin's novel The Arabian Nightmare, Sultan's doppelgänger is discovered and is questioned. "He was bastinadoed lightly to make him talk (for a heavy bastinado killed), but the man sobered up quickly and said nothing."
In Chapter 58 of Innocents Abroad by Mark Twain, a member of Twain's party goes to collect a specimen from the face of the Sphinx and Twain sends a sheik to warn him of the consequences: "...by the laws of Egypt the crime he was attempting to commit was punishable with imprisonment or the bastinado."
 In Henri Charrière's Papillon, the author recalls having this done to him at Devil's Island, whereupon he had to be carried about in a wheelbarrow, with the soles of his feet resting against garden fork handles.
 In Tony Anthony's autobiography: Taming the Tiger, he was tortured and interrogated by Cyprian policemen using primarily this method, before being imprisoned in Nicosia central prison.
 When "Gonzo" journalist Hunter S. Thompson ran an unsuccessful campaign for Sheriff of Pitkin County, Colorado, in 1970, he said his plan for dealing with the illicit drug trade was that "My first act as Sheriff will be to install, on the courthouse lawn, a bastinado platform and a set of stocks in order to punish dishonest dope dealers in a proper public fashion."
 In Mario Puzo's novel of The Godfather, three corrupt home-repair workers are "thoroughly bastinadoed" by Sonny Corleone.

Methods 

The prisoner is barefooted and restrained in such manner that the feet cannot be shifted out of position. The intention is to avert serious injuries of the forefoot by stray hitting, especially of the fracturable toes. The energy of the stroke impacts is typically meant to be absorbed by the muscular tissue inside the vaults of the feet.

In the Middle Eastern falaka method, the victim is forced to lie on his or her back while the feet are elevated and bound. The beating is generally performed with a rigid wooden stick, a club or a truncheon. The term falaka describes the wooden plank used to tie up the ankles; however, different items are used for this purpose. This approach is very painful to the bare ankles.

The Middle Eastern falaka method can cause more serious injuries, such as bone fractures and nerve damage, than the German method, since the person undergoing falaka can, to a certain degree, move their body and feet; as a result, strokes land more or less randomly and injury-prone areas are frequently affected. As falaka is usually carried out with a rigid and often heavy stick, it accordingly causes blunt trauma leaving the person unable to walk and often impeded for life. In the German method, the prisoner was principally unable to move and the beatings were performed with more lightweight objects, thinner in diameter and usually slightly flexible. The physical aftereffects of the procedure were mostly superficial and unwanted injuries were relatively rare. Therefore, the person usually was able to walk immediately following punishment. Nonetheless, the German form of bastinado caused severe levels of pain and suffering for the victim.

An alternative form of the torture is inflicted in Saudi Arabia as a penalty for, among other offenses, selling alcohol to Muslims.  After the naked feet are immobilized, their soles are repeatedly struck with a heavy leather bullwhip.  The whip is wielded by an expert who can cause the tip to crack so that bleeding wounds are inflicted and the feet are paralyzed with agony.  Twenty to fifty lashes on the naked soles is a typical duration for the torture.

Effects 
The beatings usually aim at the tender longitudinal arch of the foot avoiding the bone structure of the ball and the heel. The vaults are particularly touch-sensitive and therefore susceptible to pain due to the tight clustering of nerve endings.

Corporal 

When exerted with a thin and flexible object of lighter weight, the corporal effects usually remain temporary. The numerous bones and tendons of the foot are sufficiently protected by muscular tissue, so the impact is absorbed by the skin and muscular tissue. The skin under the soles of the human feet is of high elasticity and consistence similar to the palms of the hands. Lesions and hematoma therefore rarely occur while beating marks are mostly superficial. Depending on the characteristics of the beating device in use and the intensity of the beatings, the emerging visible aftereffects remain ascertainable over a time frame of a few hours to several days. The receiving person usually remains able to walk without help right after the punishment.

When the beating is executed with heavy sticks like clubs or truncheons according to the falaka method, bone fractures commonly occur as well as nerve damage and severe hematoma. The sustained injuries can take a long time to heal, potentially with lasting or irreversible physical damage to the human musculoskeletal system.

When thin and flexible instruments are used, the immediate experience of pain is described as acutely stinging and searing. The instant sensations are disproportionately intense compared to the applied force and reflexively radiate through the body. The subsequent pain sensations of a succession of strokes are often described as throbbing, piercing or burning and gradually ease off within a few hours. A slightly stinging or nagging sensation often remains perceptible for a couple of days, especially while walking.

As the nerve endings under the soles of the feet do not adapt to recurring sensations or impacts, the pain reception does not alleviate through continuous beatings. On the contrary, the perception of pain is further intensified over the course of additional impacts through the activation of nociceptors. Over a sequence of impacts applied with nearly constant force, the perception of pain is therefore progressively intensifying until a maximum level of activation is reached. For that reason, a relatively gentle impact can cause an acute pain sensation after a certain number of preceding strokes.

The subjective experience of corporal suffering can, however, largely diverge according to a person's individual pain tolerance. The pain reception itself is hereby aggravated through feelings of anxiety and agitation. The subjective pain susceptibility is accordingly higher the more apprehensive the individual feels about it.

See also

Barefoot
Caning
Judicial corporal punishment
Physical restraint
Prisoners' rights
Public humiliation
Submissive

References

Sources
 

Corporal punishments
Penal imprisonment
School punishments
Whipping
Physical torture techniques
Barefoot